Cantrainea globuloides is a species of sea snail, a marine gastropod mollusk in the family Colloniidae.

Description

Distribution
This marine species occurs on the Galicia Bank (Northeast Atlantic Ocean)

References

External links
  Serge GOFAS, Ángel A. LUQUE, Joan Daniel OLIVER,José TEMPLADO & Alberto SERRA (2021) - The Mollusca of Galicia Bank (NE Atlantic Ocean); European Journal of Taxonomy 785: 1–114

Colloniidae
Gastropods described in 1896